The 1855 New York state election was held on November 6, 1855, to elect the Secretary of State, the State Comptroller, the Attorney General, the State Treasurer, the State Engineer, two judges of the New York Court of Appeals, a Canal Commissioner and an Inspector of State Prisons, as well as members of the New York State Assembly and the New York State Senate.

Nominations
Both the Whig state convention and the Anti-Nebraska state convention met on September 26 at Syracuse, New York. John Alsop King presided at the Whig convention, Reuben E. Fenton at the Anti-Nebraska convention. After organizing the Whigs, the delegates decided to join the Anti-Nebraskans, and marched to their assembling place. There the two parties merged and adopted the name Republican Party, and continued as the Republican state convention with King and Fenton as co-chairmen.

Results
Due to the chaotic political situation with the major parties split over the slavery question, a new party being founded by the fusion of factions of all previous parties, and four tickets competing, the American Party had the most surprising election victory in the history of the State of New York, winning eight of the nine state offices. Only the jointly nominated Democrat Henry L. Selden could defeat his American and Republican opponents. The incumbents Cook, Follett and Darius Clark were defeated.

16 Republicans, 11 Americans, four Democrats and one Temperance man were elected to a two-year term (1856–57) in the New York State Senate.

47 Democrats, 44 Americans, 35 Republicans and 2 Whigs were elected to the New York State Assembly of the 79th New York State Legislature.

Sources
Result in The Official State Canvass in NYT on December 17, 1855 ("not fully completed", but released for publication, without the scattering votes)
 American Party ticket, in NYT on October 18, 1855
 The Republican ticket, in NYT on November 5, 1855
Results in The Tribune Almanac 1856

Notes

See also
New York state elections

1855
 
New York